Cross Contamination is an album by the rock bands Batmobile and Peter Pan Speedrock. It was released in 2008 by Suburban Records.

Track listing
"Hellalujah"
"Go Satan Go"
"Killerspeed"
"Big Toy"
"Straight Back To Hormoneville"
"Transsylvanian Express"
"Dead ( I Want Them When They Are Dead)"
"Dynamite"
"Shoot Shoot"
"Mission Impossible"

(tracks 1-5, performed by Batmobile; tracks 6-10  performed by Peter Pan Speedrock)

External links
Official Peter Pan Speedrock website
Official Batmobile website

Peter Pan Speedrock albums
Batmobile (band) albums
2008 albums
Split albums